The 1935 Iowa State Cyclones football team represented Iowa State College of Agricultural and Mechanic Arts (later renamed Iowa State University) in the Big Six Conference during the 1935 college football season. In their fifth season under head coach George F. Veenker, the Cyclones compiled a 2–4–3 record (1–3–1 against conference opponents), finished in fifth place in the conference, and were outscored by opponents by a combined total of 101 to 82. They played their home games at State Field in Ames, Iowa.

Ike Hayes was the team captain. Two Iowa State players were selected as first-team all-conference players: guard Ike Hayes and tackle John Catron.

Schedule

References

Iowa State
Iowa State Cyclones football seasons
Iowa State Cyclones football